The 2011 Rally Argentina was the sixth round of the 2011 World Rally Championship season. The rally took place over 26–29 May, and was based in Villa Carlos Paz, in the province of Córdoba. The rally was also the third round of the Production World Rally Championship. Argentina returned to the WRC calendar for the first time since 2009, after the event was a part of the Intercontinental Rally Challenge in 2010.

Sébastien Loeb took his third win of the season and the 65th WRC win of his career after a come-from-behind victory over the final two days. Having run first on the road on the first day, Loeb trailed Jari-Matti Latvala by 90 seconds after day one, but six stage victories over the final two days helped to recover some of the lost time and ultimately took the rally victory on the final stage. Mikko Hirvonen was second, 2.4 seconds in arrears, with Sébastien Ogier a further 4.9 seconds back in third. Ogier had led the event into the final stage, but was driving a damaged car after a roll on an earlier stage. In the PWRC, Hayden Paddon took class victory and two points for an overall ninth place.

Results

Event standings

Special stages

Power Stage
The "Power stage" was a live, televised  stage at the end of the rally, held in Cabalango.

References

External links
 Results at eWRC.com

Argentina
Rally Argentina
Rally Argentina
Rally Argentina